Noble is a small unincorporated community in Ozark County, Missouri, United States. It is located on a ridge along Route A, one mile west of Route 5 and twelve miles northwest of Gainesville.

A post office was established at Noble in 1890, and remained in operation until 1999. According to one tradition, one Mr. Noble, an early postmaster, gave the community his last name.

References

Unincorporated communities in Ozark County, Missouri
Unincorporated communities in Missouri